The 121st Infantry Division was a German Wehrmacht division in World War II.  It was a part of the German XXVIII Army Corps. In September 1941 the formation, on arriving in Pavlovsk, Saint Petersburg; engaged in the siege of Leningrad.  By October 1941 it was down to 40% of its authorized strength and 3 infantry battalions had to be disbanded due to high casualties.  In 1944 it was involved in the retreat from Leningrad through the Baltic states wherein it fought in the Battle of Pskov.  It remained in the Courland pocket until the end of the war.

Commanding officers 
General der Artillerie Curt Jahn, 5 October 1940 – 6 May 1941
Generalleutnant Otto Lancelle, 6 May 1941 – 8 July 1941
General der Artillerie Martin Wandel, 8 July 1941 – 11 Nov 1942
General der Infanterie Helmuth Prieß, 11 November 1942 – March 1944
Generalmajor Ernst Pauer von Arlau, March 1944 – 1 June 1944
Generalleutnant Rudolf Bamler, 1 June 1944 – 27 June 1944
General der Infanterie Helmuth Prieß, 27 June 1944 – 10 July 1944
General der Infanterie Theodor Busse, 10 July 1944 – 1 August 1944
Generalleutnant Werner Ranck, 1 August 1944 – 30 April 1945
Generalmajor Ottomar Hansen, 30 April 1945 – 8 May 1945

Composition 
405th Infantry Regiment
407th Infantry Regiment
408th Infantry Regiment
121st Artillerie Regiment
121st Reconnaissance Battalion
121st Tank Destroyer Battalion
121st Engineer Battalion
121st Signal Battalion
121st Divisional Supply Troops

References

Bibliography 

Infantry divisions of Germany during World War II
Military units and formations established in 1941
Military units and formations disestablished in 1945